Jules Peter Paivio (29 April 1917 – 4 September 2013) was a Canadian architect, professor, and soldier. A veteran of the Spanish Civil War, he was the last surviving member of the Mackenzie–Papineau Battalion.

Early life and family 
Paivio was born near Port Arthur, Ontario, and raised in nearby Sudbury by his Finnish parents. His father Aku Päiviö was a Finnish Canadian journalist, poet and socialist. Päiviö's brother Allan Paivio was an emeritus professor of psychology at the University of Western Ontario. He was best known for his dual-coding theory.

Spanish Civil War
Paivio left Canada at the age of 19 to fight in the Spanish Civil War. He was captured during the war, saved from execution by an Italian officer, and placed in a prisoner-of-war camp. Paivio was the last surviving Canadian veteran of the Spanish Civil War, and in 2012 he was honored by the Spanish government by being granted honorary citizenship.

World War II
During World War II, Paivio trained soldiers in map-reading and surveying.

Academic career
Paivio was a trained architect and taught at Ryerson University.

Death
Jules Paivio died on 4 September 2013, at the age of 97.

References

1917 births
2013 deaths
Canadian people of Finnish descent
Canadian people of the Spanish Civil War
Canadian architects
Academic staff of Toronto Metropolitan University

External links 
Documentary film "To My Son in Spain: Finnish Canadians in the Spanish Civil War